The Memphis Flyer is a free weekly alternative newspaper serving the greater Memphis, Tennessee, area. The Flyer covers Memphis news, politics, music, entertainment, sports, food, and spirits.  the weekly print circulation is 44,000.

The Flyer was founded in 1989 by publisher Kenneth Neill. The current editor is Shara Clark. The Flyer is a publication of Contemporary Media, Inc. which also publishes Memphis magazine, Memphis Parent, and Inside Memphis Business.

The Memphis Flyer is distributed throughout the Mid-South on Wednesday morning. It has an average audited weekly pickup rate of 93 percent.

The Flyer's website, Memphisflyer.com, features daily posts of local news, politics, music, food, and entertainment. Content from the Flyer's weekly print edition is posted on Thursday morning.

References

External links
Memphis Flyer profile at the Association of Alternative Newsmedia (AAN)
Memphis Flyer website 

Newspapers published in Memphis, Tennessee
Newspapers established in 1989
Alternative weekly newspapers published in the United States